The United States Court of Appeals for the Tenth Circuit (in case citations, 10th Cir.) is a federal court with appellate jurisdiction over the district courts in the following districts:

 District of Colorado
 District of Kansas
 District of New Mexico
 Eastern District of Oklahoma
 Northern District of Oklahoma
 Western District of Oklahoma
 District of Utah
 District of Wyoming

These districts were part of the Eighth Circuit until 1929.
The court is composed of twelve active judges and is based at the Byron White U.S. Courthouse in Denver, Colorado. It is one of thirteen United States courts of appeals and has jurisdiction over 560,625 square miles, or roughly one seventh of the country's land mass.

History 

Congress created a new judicial circuit in 1929 to accommodate the increased caseload in the federal courts. Between 1866 and 1912, twelve new states had entered the Union and been incorporated into the Eighth and Ninth Circuits. The Eighth Circuit encompassed 13 states and had become the largest in the nation.

Chief Justice William Howard Taft suggested the reorganization of the Eighth Circuit Court in response to widespread opposition in 1928 to a proposal to reorganize the nation's entire circuit structure. The original plan had sprung from an American Bar Association committee in 1925 and would have changed the composition of all but two circuits.

The House of Representatives considered two proposals to divide the existing Eighth Circuit. A bill by Representative Walter Newton would separate the circuit's eastern and western states. An alternate proposal divided the northern from the southern states. With the judges and bar of the existing Eighth Circuit for Newton's bill and little opposition to dividing the circuit, lawmakers focused on providing for more judgeships and meeting places of the circuit courts of appeals in their deliberations.

In 1929, Congress passed a law that placed the federal U.S. district courts in Minnesota, Iowa, North Dakota, South Dakota, Nebraska, Missouri, and Arkansas in the Eighth Circuit and created a Tenth Circuit that included Wyoming, Colorado, Utah, New Mexico, Kansas, and Oklahoma. Three additional judgeships were authorized and the sitting circuit judges were reassigned according to their residence. The Tenth Circuit was assigned a total of four judgeships.

Current composition of the court 
:

Vacancies and pending nominations

List of former judges

Chief judges

Succession of seats

See also 
 Judicial appointment history for United States federal courts of the Tenth Circuit
 List of current United States Circuit Judges

Notes

References 
 
 primary but incomplete source for the duty stations
 
 secondary source for the duty stations
 data is current to 2002
 
 source for the state, lifetime, term of active judgeship, term of chief judgeship, term of senior judgeship, appointer, termination reason, and seat information

External links 

 United States Court of Appeals for the Tenth Circuit
 Recent opinions from FindLaw
 The Tenth Judicial Circuit Historical Society

 
Denver
Oklahoma City
Salt Lake City
Tulsa, Oklahoma
1929 establishments in the United States
Courts and tribunals established in 1929